This article is a list of presidents of the University of Scranton, located in Scranton, Pennsylvania.

References 

Presidents of the University of Scranton
Scranton